Irving S. Kosloff (May 10, 1912, Philadelphia, PennsylvaniaFebruary 19, 1995, Merion, Pennsylvania) was an American businessman and sportsman.

Early life and education
He was born in Philadelphia, the son of Russian Jewish immigrants Lillian and Louis Kosloff. He had two brothers, Carl and Charles Kosloff. He graduated from South Philadelphia High School in 1930, where he played football and basketball as an offensive center and middle linebacker. Initially, Irv set out to be a dentist. However, after a knee injury, he lost his athletic scholarship to Temple University, which he had attended for approximately two years but had to drop out and search for a job for lack of funds. He found a job in the traffic department of the Container Corporation of America in Manayunk, Philadelphia. In 1932, he founded the Roosevelt Paper Company on State Road near Cottman Avenue in Philadelphia. Over the years, the company grew into one of the nation’s leading merchant/converters of printing and packaging paper.

Career
In May 1963, Kosloff, with the inspiration and aid of high-school classmate attorney Ike Richman, purchased the Syracuse Nationals of the National Basketball Association (NBA) from Danny Biasone, brought them to Philadelphia, and changed the team's name to the Philadelphia 76ers. Richman ran the day-to-day operations of the team, with Kosloff, busy with his growing paper business, remaining the silent partner.

On December 4, 1965, Richman died of a heart attack at a 76ers-Boston Celtics game. Kosloff brought in Jack Ramsay to manage the team.

Kosloff, an executive who insisted on answering his own telephone and never hired a secretary, attended 76ers games regularly at the Spectrum until slowed recently by illness.

During Kosloff's tenure as owner, the Sixers made the playoffs nine time and won an NBA championship in 1966–67.

Kosloff sold most of his interest in the 76ers to Fitz Eugene Dixon Jr. for $8 million on May 28, 1976. He kept 10% of the team until it was sold to Harold Katz in 1980

Death

Kosloff died of leukemia at his home in Merion, Pennsylvania in 1995.

References

External links
Entry at the Philadelphia Jewish Sports Hall of Fame
Obituary at the New York Times

1912 births
1995 deaths
Basketball players from Philadelphia
Players of American football from Philadelphia
Sportspeople from Philadelphia
Businesspeople from Philadelphia
National Basketball Association executives
Philadelphia 76ers owners
American people of Russian-Jewish descent
20th-century American businesspeople
Deaths from cancer in Pennsylvania
Deaths from leukemia
Burials in Pennsylvania
South Philadelphia High School alumni